Time base correction (TBC) is a technique to reduce or eliminate errors caused by mechanical instability present in analog recordings on mechanical media. 

Without time base correction, a signal from a videotape recorder (VTR) or videocassette recorder (VCR) cannot be mixed with other, more time-stable devices found in television studios and post-production facilities. 

Most broadcast quality VCRs have simple time base correctors built in though external TBCs are often used.  Some high-end domestic analog video recorders and camcorders also include a TBC circuit, which typically can be switched off if required.

Time base correction counteracts errors by buffering the video signal as it comes off the videotape at an unsteady rate, and releasing it at a steady rate. TBCs also allow a variable delay in the video stream. By adjusting the rate and delay using a waveform monitor and a vectorscope, the corrected signal can now match the timing of the other devices in the system.  If all of the devices in a system are adjusted so their signals meet the video switcher at the same time and at the same rate, the signals can be mixed.  A single master clock or "sync generator" provides the reference for all of the devices' clocks.

Video correction
As far back as 1956, professional reel-to-reel audio tape recorders relying on mechanical stability alone were stable enough that pitch distortion could be below audible level without time base correction.  However, the higher sensitivity of video recordings meant that even the best mechanical solutions still resulted in detectable distortion of the video signals and difficulty locking to downstream devices. A video signal consists of picture information but also sync and subcarrier signals which allow the image to be framed up square on the monitor, reproduce colors accurately and, importantly, allow the combination and switching of two or more video signals.

Types 
Physically there are only 4 types, dedicated IC, add-in cards for prosumer/professorial VTR/VCRs, desktop standalone units & dedicated rack mount units.

In the broadcast world, 1U Rack-mount type time base correctors were common & intended to be easily slid out of a rack on rails to be serviced, as these units were meant for 24/7 workloads and typically contained little to no SMD hardware, only operator serviceable through-hole electronics, making these units a substantially heavy device.

Software Time Base Correction 

A modern 5th and final type of TBC being achieved in the late 2010s is software defined, packaged inside the open source python based VHS-Decode & CVBS-Decode projects which evolved from the LD-Decode project which uses FM RF captures of analouge media signals then de-modulates and corrects the signal in software.

This introduced the .TBC file format a lossless 4fsc digital format not dissembler to D-2 & D-3 videotape storing uncompressed composite/s-video (combined or Luminance/Chrominance separated) analog video signals in 16-bit unsigned grey scale values these can be opened inside the open source ld-analyse for frame by frame analysis, closed captioning & VITC timecode readout these files can even be played back to analouge TV systems via a DAC or more commonly chroma-decoded and then encoded to a lossless compressed FFV1 .mkv video file via FFMPEG for archival and futher processing. 

 Sampling Rate: 4fsc PAL (17727262 Hz)
 Sampling NTSC: 4fsc NTSC (14118181 Hz)
 Data Rate PAL: 
 CVBS 2.1GB/min 35MB/s (280mbps) 
 Y+C 4.2GB/min 70MB/s (560mbps)
 Data Rate NTSC: 
 CVBS 1.7GB/min 28.33MB/s (226.5mbps)
 Y+C 3.4GB/min 56.66MB/s (453mbps)

Methods
Implicit in the idea of time base correction is that there must be some target time base that the corrector is aiming for.  There are two time bases commonly used.  The first method is to make the frames, fields and lines come out smoothly and uniformly, at the rates specified by the standards using an oscillator for time reference.  The alternative to this method is to align the frames, fields, and lines with some external signal, a procedure called genlocking.  Genlocking allows sources that are not themselves genlock-capable to be used with production switchers and A/B roll editing equipment.  Stand-alone broadcast model time base correctors typically will genlock the signal to an external sync reference, and also allow the brightness, contrast, chrominance, and color phase ("tint" or "hue") to be adjusted.

Some TBCs featured a Drop Out Compensation (DOC) circuit that enabled videotape flaws caused by oxide drop-out to be temporarily corrected. The DOC circuit required dedicated cabling between the videotape player and the TBC in which irregularities were detected in portions of the video image. Previously captured and stored lines of video would then be superimposed over the flawed video lines.

Satellites, microwave transmitters and other broadcast signals as well as consumer VTRs cannot be sent an advance sync signal. The synchronizer accomplishes this by (first digitizing in an analog scenario and) writing the incoming digital video into a frame buffer memory using the timing of the sync information contained in that video signal. A frame synchronizer stores at least a full frame of video. Simultaneously the digital video is being read back out of the buffer by an independent timing system that is genlocked to the house timing reference. If the buffer over or underfills, the Frame Sync will hold the last good frame of video until another full frame's worth of video is received. Usually, this is undetectable to viewers.

See also 
Drop-out compensator
Frame synchronization (video)
Video router
Vision mixer

Notes

References

A digital synchronizer for a video-tape recorder, Bucciarelli, F.V.; Proceedings of the IEEE, Volume 61,  Issue 4,  April 1973 Page(s):506 - 507
oldvcr.com Sony, Sony BVT-800, Professional Timebase Corrector
oldvcr.com FOR.A FA-410, Professional Timebase Corrector

Film and video technology
Television technology
Television terminology
Videotape